Online Public Relations (E-PR, Digital PR) refers to the use of the internet to communicate with both potential and current customers in the public realm. It functions as the web relationship influence among the cyber citizens and it aims to make desirable comments about an organization, its products and services, news viewed by its target audiences and lessen its undesirable comments to a large degree. Online public relations shows differences from traditional public relations. One of these is associated with its platforms. Compared with traditional public relations channels (such as TV, radio and printed press), the network systems used for online public relations vary from search to social platforms. In the era of digital marketing, the major online public relations tools for the public relations professionals and marketers such as content marketing, search engine optimization are the results of mixture of digital technologies and public relations. Those approaches have become the mainstream digital marketing machines and learning to take advantage of these marketing tools is an essential part of modern public relations strategies.

Differences between online and traditional public relations 

 The organizations can communicate with its audiences directly through a variety of online platforms instead of depending on the media channels only
 Audiences exposed to the information are linked to the network and then the flow of information is multi-directional among people
 Multiple sources of information provided can be accessible to audiences
 Audiences are entitled to the right to review, comment and assess 
Online PR targets social media, web searches, blogs, and websites in addition to targeting traditional media outlets

Tactics
Buzz marketing means marketers first identify the Alpha consumer in terms of a new idea and technologies and then promote specifically made messages such as a funny video or email with the help of the network of those Alpha consumers. One of the typical examples was that Paper Magazine issued a nearly naked image of Kim Kardashian on their cover, then viewers who saw the photo responded immediately and made it spread quickly. As the whole version had come out, nearly one percent of the entire web activities in the US got involved.

There are relevant worries about some counter-arguments about brands reputation. Marketers are responsible for coping with unfavorable mentions quickly through online reputation management such as Google Alerts to influence people' attitudes toward those negative comments.

The internet platforms provide organizations a variety of channels to issue timely news and information. The forms of information can vary from search to social to brand management platforms such as email alerts or news stories. These contents provided by organizations allow media channels to find news sources easily, which can increase the exposure of organizations and then improve public relations.

Link building is used to achieve and create hyperlinks to other third-party website or related site to help netizens to navigate between websites. Building high-quality links, even if the links are non-follow can have an effect on search result ranking and increase the flow of visitors to the site. Then finding partners websites to link and then increasing more traffic is involved in the daily work of online public relations professionals.

See also
 Marketing communications
 Affiliate marketing

References

Public relations
Digital marketing